Gabriel Moraru (born 27 January 1982) is a retired Romanian tennis player and currently a tennis coach. Since 2017 he is the coach of fellow Romanian Ana Bogdan. On 25 July 2005 he reached his highest ATP singles ranking of World No. 234 whilst his best doubles ranking was World No. 125 on 19 September 2005.

Career finals

Doubles finals: 10 (4–6)

References

External links
 
 
 

1982 births
Living people
Sportspeople from Constanța
Romanian male tennis players
Romanian tennis coaches
21st-century Romanian people